Charles Épalle (8 March 1924 – 24 April 2008) was a French athlete. He competed in the men's triple jump at the 1948 Summer Olympics.

References

1924 births
2008 deaths
Athletes (track and field) at the 1948 Summer Olympics
French male triple jumpers
Olympic athletes of France
Place of birth missing